WEAG-FM (106.3 FM) is a radio station licensed to Starke, Florida, United States, and airs a country music format using the moniker "Eagle Country".  The station is currently owned by Dickerson Broadcasting, Inc.

History
The station went on the air as WPXE-FM on February 28, 1978.  On Leap Day (February 29) 1988, the station changed its call sign to the current WEAG-FM.

Programming
WEAG-FM airs American Country Countdown with Kix Brooks.

References

External links

EAG-FM
Radio stations established in 1978
1978 establishments in Florida